Mary Watts may refer to:

Mary Seton Watts (1849–1938), English architect, artist and social reformer
Mary Stanbery Watts (1868–1958), American novelist